Oricia is a genus of moths of the family Notodontidae. It consists of the following species:
Oricia hillmani  Miller, 2008
Oricia homalochroa  (C. and R. Felder, 1874) 
Oricia phryganeata  (Warren, 1907) 
Oricia truncata Walker, 1854

Notodontidae of South America